Rajesh Lilothia (born 4 July 1969) is an Indian politician of Indian National Congress party from Delhi. He was elected to Delhi Legislative Assembly from Patel Nagar constituency in 4th Delhi Assembly. He was the President of Delhi Pradesh Youth Congress from 2001 to 2006. He held the post of Secretary in All India Congress Committee and in-charge of Bihar. He was recently appointed the Working President of Delhi Pradesh Congress Committee.

Personal life and education
He was born in a humble Hindu family in the year 1969 in Delhi. He completed his graduation from Hansraj College, Delhi University and post graduation in Disaster Mitigation from Sikkim Manipal University.

Political career

2020 Delhi Legislative Assembly election

Rajesh Lilothia contested from the Mangol Puri constituency as a Congress party candidate for 2020 Delhi Legislative Assembly election. But he lost the contest. Rakhi Birla won as AAP candidate.

2019 Indian general elections

He contested 2019 Indian general election as a candidate of Indian National Congress from North West Delhi Lok Sabha constituency. But he lost the contest.

2015 Delhi Legislative Assembly election

He lost the election in 2015 from Patel Nagar constituency. Hazari Lal Chauhan won this seat as AAP candidate.

2013 Delhi Legislative Assembly election

Rajesh Lilothia lost the election. AAP candidate Veena Anand gained this seat.

2008 Delhi Legislative Assembly election

Rajesh Lilothia won and INC held Patel Nagar seat.

References

1969 births
Living people
20th-century Indian politicians
Indian National Congress politicians from Delhi
Delhi politicians
Delhi MLAs 2008–2013